The 2001 America East men's basketball tournament was hosted by the Delaware Blue Hens at Bob Carpenter Center . The final was held at Hofstra Arena on the campus of Hofstra University. Hofstra gained its second consecutive berth to the NCAA tournament with its win over Delaware. Hofstra was given the 13th seed in the East Regional of the NCAA Tournament and lost in the first round to UCLA 61–48.

Bracket and Results

* Game Ended in Overtime

See also
America East Conference

References

America East Conference men's basketball tournament
2000–01 America East Conference men's basketball season
College basketball tournaments in Delaware
College basketball tournaments in New York (state)